Cuevitas is a census-designated place (CDP) in Hidalgo County, Texas. The population was 40 at the 2010 United States Census. Rated the poorest community in Texas, it is part of the McAllen–Edinburg–Mission Metropolitan Statistical Area.

Geography
Cuevitas is located at  (26.262686, -98.578912).

Demographics
As of the census of 2000, there were 37 people, 12 households, and 9 families residing in the CDP. The population density was 136.3 people per square mile (52.9/km2). There were 16 housing units at an average density of 58.9/sq mi (22.9/km2). The racial makeup of the CDP was 100.00% Hispanic.

There were 12 households, out of which 25.0% had children under the age of 18 living with them, 58.3% were married couples living together, 16.7% had a female householder with no husband present, and 16.7% were non-families. 16.7% of all households were made up of individuals, and 8.3% had someone living alone who was 65 years of age or older. The average household size was 3.08 and the average family size was 3.50.

In the CDP, the population was spread out, with 24.3% under the age of 18, 13.5% from 18 to 24, 24.3% from 25 to 44, 18.9% from 45 to 64, and 18.9% who were 65 years of age or older. The median age was 38 years. For every 100 females, there were 68.2 males. For every 100 females age 18 and over, there were 86.7 males.

The median income for a household in the CDP was $8,750, and the median income for a family was $8,750. Males had a median income of $0 versus $0 for females. The per capita income for the CDP was $1,703, which is the lowest in the state of Texas. There were 100.0% of families and 100.0% of the population living below the poverty line, including 100.0% of under 18s and none of those over 64.

Education
Cuevitas is within the boundary of La Joya Independent School District. The zoned schools for residents are Sam Fordyce Elementary School, Lorenzo de Zavala Middle School, and La Joya High School.

In addition, South Texas Independent School District operates magnet schools that serve the community.

References

Census-designated places in Texas
Census-designated places in Hidalgo County, Texas